Sebastian Vedsted Jespersen (born May 6, 1973 in Farum, north of Copenhagen, Denmark) is the CEO and co-founder of the digital agency Vertic. Sebastian Jespersen is an innovator, a business strategist, and a digital thought leader. The Internationalist awarded Jespersen "Agency Innovator 2012". Jespersen lives today in New York City. He founded the digital agency Vertic over a decade ago; today, it operates globally and is part of Globant, a digitally native organization that operates a global network with more than 40 offices and over 9000 employees.

Before founding Vertic, Jespersen functioned as a management consultant in Europe and Asia at Ernst & Young Management Consulting and CSC Strategic Consulting.

His book on Entangled Marketing got published in the spring of 2016, and is co-authored with the Stan Rapp, Co-Founder and CEO of Rapp & Collins. In 2018, Jespersen and Rapp released a book sequel called "Share of Life" that has been recognized by several influential publications such as Forrester Research.

References

Living people
1973 births
21st-century Danish businesspeople
People from Furesø Municipality